The Paris Graduate School of Digital Innovation (or EPITECH), formerly European Institute of Information Technology, is a private institution of higher education in computer science that was founded in 1999.

Headquartered in Le Kremlin-Bicêtre, south of Paris, the school has campuses in Bordeaux, Rennes, Marseille, Lille, Lyon, Montpellier, Nancy, Nantes, Nice, Strasbourg, Toulouse and Saint-André, Réunion. The school also has locations in Barcelona (Spain), Tirana (Albania), Berlin (Germany), and Brussels (Belgium).

The school has the particularity to teach with practical cases instead of theoretical. Epitech has also an Executive MBA in IT and entrepreneurship course targeting executive managers in computer science.

The institution is part of IONIS Education Group.

History 

Epitech was created in 1999, taking advantage of the keen interest of the École Pour l'Informatique et les Techniques Avancées EPITA to train students with a specific interest for computer sciences related matter only.

In 2007, Epitech opened new campuses in Casablanca, Dalian, Bordeaux, Lille, Lyon, Nantes, Strasbourg and Toulouse.
Since January 2008, the degree delivered has been recognized by the Commission nationale de la certification professionnelle, as level 1.
In 2008, the campuses of Nice, Montpellier, Nancy, Marseille and Rennes were opened.

New campuses abroad 
In early 2013, Epitech announced it would open a campus in Beijing, China in September 2013 and further international branches in California, United Kingdom and Spain by September 2014.

Partnership 
EPITECH has partnered with the Zup de Co association to create the Web@cademie, a 2-year training completely free for students without the French Baccalaureate and with a strong motivation in computer science. This course has the goal to attain a job of software developer for young people who have stopped their regular studies. They are trained by EPITECH teachers at Le Kremlin-Bicêtre and in Lyon.

Notable alumni
 Solomon Hykes (2006), CEO of Docker, Inc.;

References

External links
  

1999 establishments in France
Computer science education
Education in Bordeaux
Education in Île-de-France
Education in Lille
Education in Lyon
Education in Montpellier
Education in Nancy, France
Education in Nantes
Education in Nice
Education in Rennes
Education in Strasbourg
Education in Toulouse
Education in Réunion
Education in Barcelona
Educational institutions established in 1999
Technical universities and colleges in France